Koi No Yokan is the seventh studio album by American alternative metal band Deftones, released on November 12, 2012, by Reprise Records. Its title is a phrase from Japanese language  "恋の予感", translating to "premonition of love".

Koi No Yokan was met with widespread acclaim from critics upon its release, and debuted at number eleven on the US Billboard 200, selling over 65,000 copies in its first week of sales. According to Nielsen SoundScan, it has sold over 200,000 copies to date in the United States.

Background
Band frontman Chino Moreno characterized the album as "dynamic" with a full range of noise, noting an increased contribution of ideas by bassist Sergio Vega compared to their previous record, Diamond Eyes.

A major change in the recording process came with the use of the Fractal Audio Systems Axe-Fx preamp/effects processor, which creates the sound of multiple outboard amps and pedals and allowed for different tones. Vega said the group was able to "bring Fractal into hotel rooms and run it into software and record ideas and flesh them out later". The group tracked guitar, bass and vocals, then recorded drums and replaced the guitar, bass and vocals. Vega confirmed that "everything was organic".

Composition 
Described as having an "alternative metal vibe", the music incorporates experimental elements from the band's previous albums Saturday Night Wrist (2006) and Diamond Eyes (2010), incorporating elements from metal (including doom metal and groove metal), alternative rock, shoegaze, dream pop, hardcore punk, post-rock, and prog rock.

Release
On September 19, 2012, the band released the song "Leathers" as a promotional single via a free download on their website. On October 8, 2012, "Leathers" was released as the album's first single. "Leathers" was also released as a limited-edition cassingle with "Rosemary" as the B-side.

On October 3, 2012, the song "Tempest" premiered on PureVolume for streaming. "Tempest" was released as a single on October 9, 2012.

Koi No Yokan was released on vinyl in four versions: a standard retail version pressed on 140-gram black vinyl (3,000 units), a direct-to-consumer version on 180-gram black vinyl with foil-stamped numbered jackets (1,000 units), an international edition pressed on 180-gram vinyl and an exclusive edition sold through Hot Topic retailers pressed on 140-gram clear-colored vinyl (1,500 units).

This was also the first album released through HDtracks.

Tour
The band launched a tour on October 9, 2012, which ended on November 21 in Los Angeles. The band played at venues with capacities between 1,000 and 4,000 with the goal being to allow fans to experience the music before the album was released.

Critical reception

The album was met with overall critical acclaim. The aggregate review site Metacritic assigned an average score of 86 to the album based on 18 reviews, indicating "Universal Acclaim". With this score, Koi No Yokan was among the eight best-reviewed albums of 2012. Gregory Heaney of AllMusic wrote, "While a lot of bands out there have been tinkering with the loud/quiet dynamic for decades now, what makes Deftones so special is their ability to do both at the same time, effectively blending the calm and the storm into a single sound". Mischa Pearlman of BBC Music wrote, "It transcends the boundaries and expectations of its genre--even those previously set by the very band that made it". Al Horner of NME said of the album, "It's a shotgun blast of cranked guitars, bruising hardcore and canyon-sized choruses, and it's mesmerising". Greg Fisher of Sputnikmusic called it "a remarkably consistent effort" that "glitters with supreme melodies as much as crushes with massive riffs showcasing the quintet's most accomplished material in over a decade". Rolling Stone called the album "adventurously aggressive" and stated, "Koi No Yokan ranges from brutal, blunt-force trauma ('Gauze') to epic prog-rock atmospherics (the sprawling, enchanting 'Tempest'). Opener 'Swerve City' sets the tone immediately with a bludgeoning riff, but Deftones also take nuanced approaches to angsty tension, weaving meticulously crafted cosmic rock on 'Entombed' and wading through murky, jagged textures on 'Rosemary'".

In May 2013, Revolver named Koi No Yokan the "Album of the Year" at the fifth annual Revolver Golden Gods Award Show.

Commercial performance
The album debuted at No. 11 on Billboard 200, and No. 5 on the Top Rock Albums, selling 65,000 copies in the first week. The album has sold 214,000 copies in the US as of March 2016.

Track listing

Personnel 
Adapted from the CD liner notes.

Deftones
 Abe Cunningham − drums
 Stephen Carpenter − guitar
 Frank Delgado − samples, keyboards
 Chino Moreno − vocals, guitar
 Sergio Vega − bass

Technical
 Nick Raskulinecz − production
 Matt Hyde − production, engineering
 Steve Olmon − engineering
 Rich Costey − mixing
 Eric Isip − mixing
 Ted Jensen − mastering
 Chris Kasych − protools mix engineering
 Frank Maddocks − art direction, package design
 Futura − photography
 13th Witness − band photograph

Charts

Weekly charts

Year-end charts

References

2012 albums
Deftones albums
Reprise Records albums
Albums produced by Nick Raskulinecz